Al-Thawra Sport Club is an Iraqi football team based in Kirkuk, that plays in Iraq Division Two.

History

In Premier League
Al-Thawra team played in the Iraqi Premier League for the first time in the 1977–78 season, the team ended their first season in twelfth place and was able to continue playing in the league, and their results were not good, as it won three matches, drawing three, and lost seven. The team played their second season, the 1978–79 season, did not bring anything new, as the team continued its poor results, winning one match, drawing one and losing all their other matches, and relegated to the Iraq Division One.

Managerial history

  Mohammed Balla
  Emad Qadir
  Mohammed Hadi Jassim
  Sabah Ghani
  Taha Qasim

Famous players
Sherko Karim

References

External links
 Al-Thawra SC on Goalzz.com
 Iraq Clubs- Foundation Dates

1955 establishments in Iraq
Association football clubs established in 1955
Football clubs in Kirkuk